Pageantry is a colorful display, as in a pageant.  It may refer to:
Beauty pageant
Drag pageantry
Medieval pageant
R.E.M.'s 1986 Tour